Girls' Catholic Central High School (GCC) was a private, non-boarding college preparatory secondary school for girls grades 9 through 12 located in midtown Detroit, Michigan. Guided by the religious philosophy of St. Thérèse the Little Flower, the school’s stated mission included the encouragement of a life-long commitment to Christian values, as well as the achievement of academic excellence. The single-sex educational program was designed with a focus on spiritual, moral, and intellectual development, and the preparation of young women for adulthood in the absence of other social distractions.

History 
In September 1893, four IHM Sisters (Sisters, Servants of the Immaculate Heart of Mary) opened a school called St. Patrick's, at Cathedral parish in Detroit. After several years as St. Patrick's Grade School, and Saints Peter and Paul Academy, the building was renamed Catholic Central High School for Girls and converted into a high school curriculum in the school year 1927-28. 
The first graduate was recorded on June 22, 1899.

Thereafter, the school, under the auspices of the Archdiocese of Detroit, was administered by the IHM Sisters, Priests of the CICM order, and was accredited by the North Central Association Commission on Accreditation. The tuition-based academic program included strict entrance exams and admission requirements under which potential student applicants were carefully scrutinized.

Many students traveled from considerable distances, not only from Detroit, Hamtramck and Highland Park but also suburbs including Ferndale, Grosse Pointe, and Livonia.  Although the student body was predominantly white for many years, the social changes of the late 1950s and early 1960s began to bring about the enrollment of a small number of students of color. In an atmosphere of ethnic, cultural, and economic diversity, young women of all nationalities, some foreign-born from Eastern European countries, were assimilating comfortably and forming strong bonds of friendship. The interactions and developing camaraderie between the high-achieving students proved to be mutually beneficial and paved the way to academic success.

Located on a quiet side street in mid-town Detroit, the three-story school building's Gothic Revival structure is in keeping with the beautiful sounds wafting from nearby Orchestra Hall as the Detroit Symphony Orchestra rehearsed. Familiar symphonies and classical works by famous composers inadvertently provided accompaniment to afternoon classes.

Academics 
The demanding college preparatory curriculum offered the required and elective courses at each grade level in Religion, English, Mathematics, Science, Social Studies, Foreign Language (Latin I, II, III), Business (Typing, Shorthand), and Physical Education. A low student-teacher ratio was maintained, ensuring a maximum student body of around 300. The faculty was strongly supported by families who shared the values and mission of Girls Catholic Central and the advantages of single-gender college preparatory education in the absence of demographic influences.

Religion 
With both St. Thérèse the Little Flower, and Patroness The Virgin Mary as inspiration, the principles of Christian life in the Roman Catholic tradition were stressed at all times. In addition to IHM Sisters faculty members, Diocesan priests of the CICM order also held regular religion classes. The academic program was accompanied by mandatory strict adherence to deeply religious values and devotion to the Catholic faith and Church rituals. Prior to the beginning of classes each morning, Mass was attended at the Chapel of St. Theresa-the Little Flower, which was adjacent to the school building, and the Sacrament of Confession was offered weekly.

From 1969 to Today 
Girls’ Catholic Central High School held its final graduation ceremony and closed its doors for the last time in 1969. The historic building sat vacant until 1973, when Sister Mary Watson, O.P. (1934-2021) of the Racine Dominican order, seized upon the previously unrecognized potential of the abandoned school building. So, she initiated a free meal program for senior parishioners of St. Patrick’s Church, which is located next door. And with the support and blessing of the Church's pastor, Rev. Thomas J. Duffey, (1924-2007), Sister Mary worked diligently, raising funds and seeking out grants in order to grow her ministry. Soon, as word spread around the Cass Corridor community, the need for the services being offered was confirmed. Today, approaching 50 years of service to Detroit seniors, St. Patrick Senior Center has grown and expanded tremendously, and currently offers a host of senior services for people over the age of 55. In addition, the building is frequently and generously shared as a nostalgic setting for class reunions held by former classmates, e.g., Girls’ Catholic Central High School, all of whom have been warmly welcomed by Sister Mary Watson and executive director, SaTrice Coleman-Betts.
This treasured alma mater is still standing proud and strong after 130 years. Honoring Sister Mary Watson’s original vision and her legacy of service, and still serving Detroit’s seniors.

References 

Archives - IHM Sisters Motherhouse, Monroe, Michigan
 St. Patrick Senior Center - 
 Video History of The School Building:  https://vimeo.com/191498440

External links 
 https://www.freep.com/mosaic-story/news/local/detroit-is/2022/03/04/st-patrick-senior-center-answers-call-help-older-adults/9360693002/
 IHM Sisters, Motherhouse, Monroe, Michigan
 CICM (Congregatio Immaculati Cordis Mariae) Congregation of the Immaculate Heart of Mary
 St. Patrick’s Senior Center

Roman Catholic Archdiocese of Detroit
Educational institutions established in 1893
1893 establishments in Michigan
Educational institutions disestablished in 1969
1969 disestablishments in Michigan
Defunct Catholic secondary schools in Michigan